Samuel James Montgomery (December 1, 1896 – June 4, 1957) was an American politician and a U.S. Representative from Oklahoma.

Biography
Born in Buffalo, Kentucky, Montgomery was the son of Henry Harrison and Ella Slack (Montgomery) Montgomery. He moved to Oklahoma in 1902 with his parents, who settled in Bartlesville. He attended the public schools, studied law at the University of Oklahoma at Norman, and was admitted to the bar in 1919. He married Elizabeth Grove Hutcheson at Fort Worth, Texas, and they had two children, Henry and Elizabeth.

Career
Montgomery practiced law in Bartlesville, Oklahoma until he enlisted as a private in the Sixth Regiment, United States Marine Corps, on July 18, 1917, and served in the Second Division, American Expeditionary Forces, until May 19, 1919, when he was honorably discharged.
He received the Croix de Guerre from the Republic of France.

Elected as a Republican to the Sixty-ninth Congress, Montgomery served from March 4, 1925, to March 3, 1927.  He was an unsuccessful candidate for reelection in 1926 to the Seventieth Congress, and practiced law in Tulsa and later in Oklahoma City.

Death
Montgomery died in Oklahoma City, Oklahoma, on June 4, 1957 (age 60 years, 185 days). He is interred in Memorial Park Cemetery, Bartlesville, Oklahoma.

References

External links

1896 births
1957 deaths
United States Marines
Republican Party members of the United States House of Representatives from Oklahoma
20th-century American politicians
United States Marine Corps personnel of World War I
Recipients of the Croix de Guerre 1914–1918 (France)